Crowfield Airfield  is a privately owned airfield located in Suffolk in the east of England. It has 2 grass runways.

Crowfield Airfield has been placed under the following restrictions which must be obeyed.

 Not more than 20 aircraft movements on any one day,
 Single engine aircraft only with 148 kW and 1200 kg limit,
 No gliders,
 No microlights,
 No helicopters,
 No parachuting,
 No aerobatics.

References

External links
 Official website

Airports in England
Transport in Suffolk
Airports in the East of England